Frog Lake is a Cree community of the Frog Lake First Nation approximately  east of Edmonton, Alberta, Canada.

Frog Lake has 2,454 band members as of August, 2007.  Frog Lake has a reserve population of approximately 1,000 residing on-reserve.

History 
Frog Lake was the scene of the Frog Lake Massacre of which nine white men were killed by Cree Indigenous people on April 2, 1885 in the course of the North-West Rebellion.

References 

Communities on Indian reserves in Alberta
Localities in the County of St. Paul No. 19
National Historic Sites in Alberta